Ivadell Brown was an American musician and vocalist, on the Audition Board of the Hollywood Bowl.

Early life
Ivadell Brown was born in Sturgis, Michigan, United States, the daughter of Frank W. Langley.

Career
She was a musician and vocalist. She was the Music chairman of the Santa Monica Bay Woman's Club. She was on the Audition Board of the Hollywood Bowl. She was a radio broadcaster.

She was a member of the Los Angeles Cosmos and the Los Angeles Manana Club.

Personal life
Ivadell Brown lived in Buffalo, New York, and moved to California in 1915 and lived at 125 Wavecrest Ave., Venice, California. She married J. Edgar Brown.

References

American women singers
American broadcasters
People from Sturgis, Michigan